Clessé may refer to:

Clessé, Deux-Sèvres, a commune in the French region of Poitou-Charentes
Clessé, Saône-et-Loire a commune in the French region of Bourgogne